Luca Napoleone  (born 30 September 1993) is a Belgian professional footballer who plays as a midfielder for Luxembourgish Wiltz 71.

Club career
After successfully completing studies in physical education, Napoleone fully dedicated himself to football and signed his first professional contract on 26 February 2018. He made his debut in the Belgian top flight for Royal Excel Mouscron on 28 July 2018 against KV Oostende. He received his first titularisation on 5 August 2018 against Club Brugge.

References

Living people
1993 births
Sportspeople from Charleroi
Belgian footballers
Footballers from Hainaut (province)
Association football midfielders
Belgian Pro League players
Belgian Third Division players
Tercera Federación players
Luxembourg National Division players
R.A.A. Louviéroise players
R. Charleroi S.C. players
R.W.D.M. Brussels F.C. players
R.A.E.C. Mons players
R. Olympic Charleroi Châtelet Farciennes players
Francs Borains players
R. Wallonia Walhain Chaumont-Gistoux players
K.S.K. Heist players
Royal Excel Mouscron players
R.E. Virton players
Real Avilés CF footballers
K. Patro Eisden Maasmechelen players
FC Wiltz 71 players
Belgian expatriate footballers
Belgian expatriate sportspeople in Spain
Expatriate footballers in Spain
Belgian expatriate sportspeople in Luxembourg
Expatriate footballers in Luxembourg